Eremophila ovata is a flowering plant in the figwort family, Scrophulariaceae and is endemic to the Northern Territory. It is a small, spreading, rounded shrub with hairy branches and leaves and pink or purple flowers which are white inside.

Description
Its branches are densely covered with simple, branched and white or yellow glandular hairs. The leaves are elliptic to egg-shaped, sometimes almost circular and covered with hairs, more densely on the lower surface. Sometimes both surfaces eventually become glabrous.

The petal tube is lilac-coloured or purple on the outside and white with lilac spots inside. The outside of the petal tube and the lobes are hairy but the inside surface of the lobes is glabrous and the inside of the tube is filled with woolly hairs. The 4 stamens are fully enclosed in the petal tube.

Taxonomy and naming
The species was first formally described in 1979 by Robert Chinnock and the description was published in Journal of the Adelaide Botanic Garden. The specific epithet (ovata) is a Latin word meaning "egg-shaped", referring to the shape of the leaves.

Distribution and habitat
Eremophila ovata only occurs in the George Gill and Gardiner Ranges in the Northern Territory where it grows in gravelly soils on slopes and in gullies.

Conservation
This species is classified as "of least concern" by the Northern Territory Government Department of Land Resource Management.

Use in horticulture
This small eremophila is fast-growing but short-lived. It flowers over a long period and is known to sucker. Propagation is easy from cuttings but grafting onto Myoporum rootstock will prevent the development of suckers. It grows best in well-drained soil in full sun or partial shade and is very drought and frost tolerant but does not thrive in areas with high humidity.

References

ovata
Flora of the Northern Territory
Plants described in 1979
Taxa named by Robert Chinnock